Adriaan Ruhan Nel (born 17 May 1991) is a South African rugby union player for the  in Super Rugby and  in the Currie Cup and in the Rugby Challenge. His regular position is full-back, winger and centre.

Youth rugby

Club rugby
He played for the  side during the 2012 Under-21 Provincial Championship and made another three senior appearances in the 2013 Vodacom Cup.
His Currie Cup debut for the Lions came during the 2013 season, when he came on as a substitute in the 54th minute against the  – and scored a try within five minutes of coming on.
He represented  in the 2015 Currie Cup Premier Division.

International
Nel was included in the South African Sevens team for the 2014 Gold Coast Sevens leg of the 2014–15 IRB Sevens World Series.

Personal life

Nel is the older brother of winger Jacques Nel.

References

External links
 

South African rugby union players
Living people
1991 births
Sportspeople from Port Elizabeth
Golden Lions players
South Africa international rugby sevens players
Griquas (rugby union) players
Western Province (rugby union) players
Stormers players
Rugby sevens players at the 2018 Commonwealth Games